Secret Life of Boys is a British children's television show broadcast on CBBC and ABC (Australian Broadcasting Company).

Series overview
<onlyinclude>

Cast

References

External links
 

BBC children's television shows
2015 British television series debuts
2021 British television series endings
Television series by Banijay